The following is a list of notable events and releases of the year 1926 in Norwegian music.

Events

Deaths

 September
 9 – Anton Jörgen Andersen, composer and cellist (born 1845).

Births

 January
 9 – Randi Hultin, jazz critic and impresario (died 2000).

 March
 1 – Erik Bye, journalist, artist, author, film actor, folk singer and radio and television personality (died 2004).

 June
 6 – Kristian Bergheim, jazz saxophonist (died 2010).

 July
 7 – Jostein Eriksen, opera singer (died 2015).

October
 19 – Arne Bendiksen, singer, composer and record producer (died 2009).

 November
 21 – Odd Børretzen, author, illustrator, translator, text writer, folk singer, and artist (died 2012).

 December
 10 – Dag Schjelderup-Ebbe, musicologist, composer, music critic and biographer (died 2013).

See also
 1926 in Norway
 Music of Norway

References

 
Norwegian music
Norwegian
Music
1920s in Norwegian music